In mathematics, the complete Fermi–Dirac integral, named after Enrico Fermi and Paul Dirac, for an index j  is defined by

This equals 

where  is the polylogarithm.

Its derivative is

and this derivative relationship is used to define the Fermi-Dirac integral for nonpositive indices j.  Differing notation for  appears in the literature, for instance some authors omit the factor .  The definition used here matches that in the NIST DLMF.

Special values 
The closed form of the function exists for j = 0:

For x = 0, the result reduces to

where  is the Dirichlet eta function.

See also 
 Incomplete Fermi–Dirac integral
 Gamma function
 Polylogarithm

References

External links
 GNU Scientific Library - Reference Manual
 Fermi-Dirac integral calculator for iPhone/iPad
 Notes on Fermi-Dirac Integrals
 Section in NIST Digital Library of Mathematical Functions
 npplus: Python package that provides (among others) Fermi-Dirac integrals and inverses for several common orders.
 Wolfram's MathWorld: Definition given by Wolfram's MathWorld.

Special functions